Team Bath Buccaneers Hockey Club is a field hockey club based in Bath, Somerset, England.  It is one of the largest and most successful Hockey Clubs in the West of England with over 800 members. The club enter teams in both the Men's The club also enters men's teams in the Gocrea8 League  and ladies teams playing in West Hockey Association.  It also has a thriving Junior Academy of 450 players and 19 teams plus Masters, Summer and Indoor sections.

The Club's motto is Fast, Fearless, Fun.

The Club was established in 1955. The Club has had a partnership with the University of Bath since 1999, and the home ground at University of Bath sports training village, with a clubhouse at the Lime Tree on campus.

Notable players

Men's internationals

 Chris Cargo
 John Jackson 
 Stuart Loughrey

 Tim Atkins

 Wayne Denne
 Jody Paul

Women's internationals

 Sophie Hamilton
 Denise Marston-Smith 
 Zoe Shipperley

References

 
English field hockey clubs
1955 establishments in England
Field hockey clubs established in 1955
Bath
Buccaneers